Lõputu päev ("Endless day") is the debut album by Estonian rock band Terminaator released in 1994. It is only released on cassette and is by now very rare and wanted by fans. Jaagup Kreem has said, that the title symbolizes immortality.

Track listing 

 Mina ja mu viin [Me and my liquor] - 3:35
 Alcohol - 2:51
 Armudes üksindusse [Falling in love with loneliness] - 5:20
 Charleen - 4:05
 Teel ära [Away on the road] - 4:05
 Suudlused [Kisses] - 3:22
 Lõputu päev [The endless day] - 5:10
 Torm [Storm] - 4:30
 Olen vaba [I'm free] - 2:42
 Ainult sina võid mu maailma muuta [Only you can change my world] - 5:41
 Meeletu maailm [Crazy world] - 5:05

Song information 
 "Mina ja mu viin" is about a man, who lost his love and starts drinking heavily, hoping, that she will want him back.
 "Alcohol" seemingly has a little to do with alcohol. The narrator wants somebody to love, and he's also dreaming about a girl, who should be that "someone". Although, it could be a love song to alcohol. The song is from the year 1989.
 "Armudes üksindusse" is about a man, who is left and is feeling lonely. He ultimately decides to cope with being alone.
 "Charleen" is about an irresistible party girl Charleen.
 "Teel ära" is about a man, who has to leave his beloved, although this is hard for him. Most likely, the reason for leaving is the difference between them.
 "Suudlused" is about a girl, who's in love with a man, whom her parents and brothers dislike. They say, that she should fear that man, but the girl doesn't care, because she likes his kisses.
 "Lõputu päev" seems to be about injustice done to the narrator. It's Jaagup Kreem's favourite song on the album.
 "Torm" is about unrequited love. It's one of Terminaator's biggest hits. It's also on "Kuld" and a live version is on the "Go Live 2005" album.
 "Olen vaba" handles the freedom after an ended relationship.
 "Ainult sina võid mu maailma muuta" is about wanting somebody you can't have. It's another big hit. It's also on "Kuld" and a live version is on "Go Live 2005".
 "Meeletu maailm" is dedicated to the deceased Tiit Must.

1994 debut albums
Terminaator albums
Estonian-language albums